This article covers Sport in Hamburg, Germany — its history and role as part of the city's culture, both on a recreational and professional level. Over the last some 125 years, many international tournaments and championships were held here.

The main sports governing body in Hamburg, the Hamburg Sport Federation (Hamburger Sportbund, HSB) represents over 500,000 member in some 780 sport clubs. About 60 teams from Hamburg are playing in German first leagues (Bundesliga), the two best known clubs from Hamburg would be the Hamburger SV and the FC St. Pauli, both men's first teams playing in the German football leagues.

History 
Sport in Hamburg has a long and distinguished history. Hamburg sport clubs were instrumental in introducing British sports to Germany, or in some cases the continent as a whole. Next to ball and equestrian sports, water sports play an important role in Hamburg. Some of the founders of the German Football Association (DFB) came from Hamburg. One of the world's oldest rowing clubs is based in Hamburg.

The Vierländer Schützengesellschaft (approximate translation: Vierlande Shooting Club) is one of the oldest still existing organisation in Hamburg. It was established in 1592. In 1830 the Hamburg Chess Club (Hamburger Schachklub, HSK or HSK von 1830) was founded.
Der Hamburger Ruder Club was founded in 1836, as one of the oldest rowing clubs in the world. In 1934 it was merged with the Germania Ruder Club (GRC), to form Der Hamburger und Germania Ruder Club (HGRC). The Germania Ruder Club's coxed fours won rowing at the 1900 Summer Olympics in Paris. 
On January 20, 1900, the FC Association 1893 Hamburg and FC Eintracht Altona were two of 86 founders of the German Football Association. As old as the history of sports clubs in Hamburg, as old is the history of competing and hosting tournaments. The 3rd Chess Olympiad organized by the German Chess Federation took place between July 13 and July 27, 1930, in Hamburg. 12 players from the Hamburg Chess Club won the German Team Championship in 1956 and 1958. In 1987 the Hamburg Chess Club were German Cup winner (Pokalsieger).

For the 2006 World Cup the Volksparkstadion became a FIFA World Cup Stadium for five matches, among others the quarter-finals Italy vs. Ukraine on June 30, 2006. Boxing for international titles like the heavyweight championship of the International Boxing Federation in 2003 and 2008 between Tony Thompson and Wladimir Klitschko were held in Hamburg.

In July 2008 the Fourth World University Championship for beach volleyball was held in Hamburg. 
The Team Hamburg Beijing for the 2008 Summer Olympics consisted of 48 athletes. In 2010 the UEFA Cup final was held at the Volksparkstadion. As of March 2015, Hamburg is in the process of submitting an application to host the 2024 Summer Olympics, a bid supported by the German Olympic Sports Confederation (DOSB).

Professional sport

Professional sport teams 

About 60 teams were fighting in German first leagues (Bundesliga ) in 2007.

Ball sports
The association football men's team Hamburger SV (HSV), one of the most successful teams in Germany, is a football team in the 2. Bundesliga. HSV is a six time German champion, a three time German cup winner and triumphed in the European cup in 1977 and 1983 and has played in the group stages of the Champions League twice; in 2000–01 and in 2006–07. Additionally FC St. Pauli is also a 2. Bundesliga football club. The HSV Handball represents Hamburg in the German handball league. Another first league team is NA. Hamburg Volleyball.

Hamburg Blue Devils was one of the prominent American Football teams playing in German Football League before its exit in 2017. Hamburg Sea Devils is a team of European League of Football (ELF) which is a planned professional league, that is set to become the first league in Europe since the demise of NFL Europe. The Sea Devils will start playing games in June 2021.

The FC St. Pauli dominates women's Rugby in Germany. Hamburg is home to the Hamburg Dockers, an Australian rules football club.

There is a football club Polonia Hamburg for the Polish diaspora in the city.

Baseball and Softball
The HSV Stealers play first division Baseball as well as the Hamburg Knights do so in Softball.

Basketball
The BCJ Hamburg played in the Basketball Bundesliga from 1999 to 2001. Later, the Hamburg Towers became the city's prime team. The Towers promoted to Germany's top division in 2019. In 2022, they already reached the playoffs. The Towers play their home games at the Edel-optics.de Arena in Wilhelmsburg.

Chess
One of the world top chess players comes from the Hamburg Chess Club and is playing in the Chess Bundesliga, the Grand Master Jan Gustafsson was in the Top 100 Players list on rank 85 in April 2005.

Cricket and lacrosse
There are also several minority sports clubs, surprisingly Hamburg has four cricket clubs, THCC Rot-Gelb (Alster CC), Pak Alemi CC, Hamburg International CC and HSV Cricket. HSV Cricket is playing in the league of the North German Cricket Federation and won several first places.  There is also the lacrosse team Hamburg Warriors at the Harvestehuder Tennis- und Hockey-Club (HTHC).

Field hockey
Hamburg is the nation's hockey capital and dominates the men's as well as the women's Bundesliga with teams like Der Club an der Alster, Großflottbeker THGC, Klipper THC, Hamburger Polo Club Harvestehuder THC or Uhlenhorster HC.

Icehockey
The Hamburg Freezers represented Hamburg in the highest ice hockey league in Germany.

Polo
The women team Polo Ladies from the Hamburg Polo Club plays also in one of the German first or second leagues. In 2004, 2005, 2006 and 2007 the men's team won the high goal class of the German Polo Championship.

Sport venues and facilities 

The Centre Court of Tennis Stadium Am Rothenbaum has a capacity of 13,200 people and is the largest tennis venue in Germany.

Most of the sports stadiums can be used as music concert venues and for other events too. The FC St. Pauli play at the Millerntor-Stadion in the St. Pauli quarter near the infamous Reeperbahn. The Volksparkstadion, (seats 50,000 ) home to the Hamburger SV, was a venue for Bruce Springsteen's Magic Tour. Hamburg Freezers and HSV Handball play at O2 World, formerly known as Color Line Arena. The Alsterschwimmhalle is Hamburg's largest aquatic center, completed in 1973 and used for swimming events.

Dulsberg is the location of one of Germany's largest Olympic Training Centers (Olympiastützpunkt or OSP), while there are also other training facilities in Allermöhe and the wider Hamburg Metropolitan Region.

Sport events

Regular sport events 

Hamburg hosts equestrian events at Klein Flottbek Derby Park (Deutsches Derby in jumping and dressage) and Horn Racecourse (Deutsches Derby in flat racing). The Berenberg Polo Derby is medium goal polo tournament, hosted by the German Polo Federation. Since 1979 the derby is held almost annually at the Hamburger Polo Club in Klein Flottbek.

The Hamburg Marathon is Germany's largest marathon after Berlin. In 2008, 23,230 participants were registered.

Worldcups in cycling, the UCI ProTour competition Vattenfall Cyclassics, and the ITU Triathlon Worldcup  known as Hamburg City Man are also major events in Hamburg. Both events have an all comers´ race.

In 2008 the German Tennis Federation (DTB) and the Association of Tennis Professionals (ATP) were divided about the status of the Hamburg Masters tournament as part of the ATP Masters Series.

The field hockey Hamburg Masters were held as a four-nation tournament.

Other national or international sport events

Non professional sport 
Non professional or recreational sports in clubs is represented by several associations. The Hamburg Sport Federation (Hamburger Sportbund, HSB) is the umbrella organisation for all sports clubs in Hamburg. Existing since 1945, in 2007 the HSB represented 502,571 member in 780 clubs  with 53 sports associations. The Association for Gymnastics (Verband für Turnen und Freizeit (VTF) ) has more than 100,000 members, followed by the Association for Football (soccer) (Hamburger Fussballbund (HFB) ). Members of the HFB are among others the Hamburger SV with more than 40,000 and the FC St. Pauli with more than 6,000 members.

There is also a wide array of student and school sport.

See also

 Sport in Germany
 Sport in Europe

Notes

References

External links

Official Website of the German University Sports Federation